Shoshana Gloriella Bush (born September 18, 1988) is an American actress. She is perhaps best known for her role in the film Dance Flick (2009).

Her aunt was actress Bonnie Franklin.

Career
Bush is a native of Tiburon, California. She has made guest appearances on television series such as CSI: Miami, Moonlight and Ghost Whisperer. In 2007, she co-starred alongside Tom Arnold in Palo Alto and then appeared in the 2008 film Fling. She made her feature debut in her best-known role to date as Megan White in Dance Flick which was released on May 22, 2009. The film grossed $28,728,151 worldwide. The same year, Bush had a small role in the film Fired Up.

Filmography

References

External links
 

Living people
American film actresses
American television actresses
Actresses from California
1988 births
People from Tiburon, California
21st-century American women
American people of Romanian-Jewish descent